Al Iaquinta (born April 30, 1987) is an American former professional mixed martial artist who competed in the lightweight division of the Ultimate Fighting Championship, having once challenged for the Lightweight championship belt. A professional MMA competitor since 2009, Iaquinta has been signed with the UFC since 2012.

Mixed martial arts career

Early career
Iaquinta, who is of Italian descent, wrestled at Wantagh High School and went on to earn his associate degree from Nassau Community College, where he also wrestled. Before turning pro, Iaquinta had a perfect amateur record of 14–0. Iaquinta began his pro MMA career fighting for the Ring of Combat promotion. There, he earned a record of 5–1–1.

The Ultimate Fighter 
Iaquinta was one of 32 lightweight fighters announced by the UFC to participate in first live season of The Ultimate Fighter reality show. Iaquinta advanced into the TUF house by defeating Jon Tuck by unanimous decision after one round. Afterwards, he was chosen as first pick for Team Faber.

After his team lost the first two matches, Iaquinta earned the first win for Team Faber by defeating Myles Jury via split decision after three rounds.

In the quarter-finals, Iaquinta fought Team Faber teammate, Andy Ogle. Iaquinta won via TKO in the closing moments of round one. The win advanced Iaquinta into the semi-finals where he faced Team Cruz's Vinc Pichel. Iaquinta defeated Pichel via unanimous decision after two rounds and moved on to the finals against teammate Michael Chiesa.

Ultimate Fighting Championship
Iaquinta officially made his UFC debut at The Ultimate Fighter 15 Finale on June 1, 2012, against Michael Chiesa to determine the winner of The Ultimate Fighter: Live. Iaquinta lost to Chiesa by submission due to a rear naked choke early in the first round.

Iaquinta was expected to face Joe Proctor on April 27, 2013, at UFC 159. However, the bout was scrapped as both fighters sustained training injuries leading up to the fight.

Iaquinta faced Ryan Couture on August 31, 2013, at UFC 164, replacing an injured Quinn Mulhern. He won the bout via unanimous decision, after dominating the fight on the feet and negating all of Couture's takedown attempts.

Iaquinta was expected to face Anthony Njokuani on October 26, 2013, at UFC Fight Night 30, replacing an injured Paul Taylor. Then on September 24, Njokuani pulled out of the event with an injury. Iaquinta instead faced Piotr Hallmann. He won the fight by unanimous decision (29–28, 30–27, and 30–27).

Iaquinta faced Kevin Lee at UFC 169 on February 8, 2014. He won the fight by unanimous decision (29–28, 29–28, and 28–27).

Iaquinta faced Mitch Clarke at UFC 173 on May 24, 2014. He lost the fight via submission (D'arce choke) in the second round.

Iaquinta faced Rodrigo Damm at UFC Fight Night 50 on September 5, 2014. Iaquinta defeated Damm via third-round TKO.

Iaquinta faced Ross Pearson on November 8, 2014, at UFC Fight Night 55. Despite being the underdog, Iaquinta won the fight via TKO in the second round.

Iaquinta faced Joe Lauzon on January 31, 2015, at UFC 183. He won the fight via TKO in the second round.

Iaquinta faced Jorge Masvidal on April 4, 2015, at UFC Fight Night 63. He won the bout via controversial split decision. 13 of 15 media outlets scored the bout in favor of Masvidal.

Iaquinta was expected to face Bobby Green on July 15, 2015, at UFC Fight Night 71. However, Green pulled out of the fight in mid-June, citing an undisclosed injury, and he was replaced by Gilbert Melendez. Subsequently, Melendez was removed from the card on July 6, after it was revealed that he tested positive for performance-enhancing drugs after his previous fight at UFC 188. In turn, Iaquinta was removed from the card as well.

Iaquinta was expected to face Thiago Alves on November 12, 2016, at UFC 205. However, Iaquinta announced on September 19 that he would not be taking the fight due to a contract dispute with the promotion.

After two years away from the sport, Iaquinta returned to face Diego Sanchez on April 22, 2017, at UFC Fight Night 108. He won the fight via knockout in the first round.

Iaquinta was expected to face Paul Felder on December 2, 2017, at UFC 218. However, Iaquinta pulled out of the fight on October 31 due to being unsatisfied with his current contract, and he was replaced by Charles Oliveira.

UFC Lightweight Championship fight
The bout with Felder was rescheduled and was expected to take place on April 7, 2018, at UFC 223. However, because of an injury to interim UFC Lightweight Champion Tony Ferguson and the state athletic commission's decision to pull replacement UFC Featherweight Champion Max Holloway over concerns over his weight cut, Iaquinta was scheduled as a replacement against Khabib Nurmagomedov in the five round main event. Although the fight was scheduled for the vacant UFC Lightweight Championship, only Nurmagomedov was eligible to win the championship due to Iaquinta weighing in at 155.2 lbs which is two tenths of a pound over the championship weight limit of 155. Iaquinta had already weighed in for his fight against Paul Felder prior to officially being announced as the new replacement. Non-championship bouts allow fighters to weigh in one pound over the limit. Ultimately, Iaquinta lost the fight via unanimous decision.

Post UFC Lightweight Championship fight
Iaquinta was scheduled to face Justin Gaethje on August 25, 2018, at UFC Fight Night 135. However, on June 28, 2018, Iaquinta withdrew from the bout, and he was replaced by James Vick.

Iaquinta faced Kevin Lee in a rematch on December 15, 2018, at UFC on Fox 31. He won the fight by unanimous decision. This win earned him the Performance of the Night award.

Iaquinta faced Donald Cerrone on May 4, 2019 at UFC Fight Night 151. He lost the fight via unanimous decision. This fight earned him the Fight of the Night bonus award.

Iaquinta faced Dan Hooker on October 6, 2019 at UFC 243. He lost the fight via unanimous decision.

Iaquinta faced Bobby Green on November 6, 2021 at UFC 268. Iaquinta lost the fight via first round TKO, marking the first time that he lost by TKO in his professional MMA career.

Iaquinta said in an interview on the MMA Hour he wasn't sure if he was retired yet and he's up in the air in regards to this.

Submission Underground
On February 23, 2020, Iaquinta faced Mike Perry at Chael Sonnen's Submission Underground 11 event. He lost the fight via fastest escape time.

Championships and accomplishments

Mixed martial arts
Ultimate Fighting Championship
Performance of the Night (One time) 
Fight of the Night (One time) 

Ring of Combat
ROC Lightweight Championship (One time)

Personal life
Iaquinta is a licensed real estate agent. He started the process of acquiring a license after a contract dispute for his fight against Thiago Alves at UFC 205.

Mixed martial arts record

|-
|Loss
|align=center|14–7–1
|Bobby Green
|TKO (punches)
|UFC 268
|
|align=center|1
|align=center|2:25
|New York City, New York, United States
|
|-
|Loss
|align=center|14–6–1
|Dan Hooker
|Decision (unanimous)
|UFC 243
|
|align=center|3
|align=center|5:00
|Melbourne, Australia
|
|-
|Loss
|align=center|14–5–1
|Donald Cerrone
|Decision (unanimous)
|UFC Fight Night: Iaquinta vs. Cowboy
|
|align=center|5
|align=center|5:00
|Ottawa, Ontario, Canada
|
|-
|Win
|align=center|14–4–1
|Kevin Lee
|Decision (unanimous)
|UFC on Fox: Lee vs. Iaquinta 2
|
|align=center|5
|align=center|5:00
|Milwaukee, Wisconsin, United States
|
|-
|Loss
|align=center|13–4–1
|
| Decision (unanimous)
|UFC 223
|
|align=center| 5
|align=center| 5:00
|Brooklyn, New York, United States
|
|-
|Win
|align=center|13–3–1
|Diego Sanchez
| KO (punches)
|UFC Fight Night: Swanson vs. Lobov
|
|align=center| 1
|align=center| 1:38
|Nashville, Tennessee, United States
|
|-
|Win
|align=center|12–3–1
|Jorge Masvidal
| Decision (split)
|UFC Fight Night: Mendes vs. Lamas
|
|align=center|3
|align=center|5:00
|Fairfax, Virginia, United States
|
|-
|Win
|align=center|11–3–1
|Joe Lauzon
|TKO (punches)
|UFC 183
|
|align=center|2
|align=center|3:34
|Las Vegas, Nevada, United States
|
|-
|Win
|align=center|
|Ross Pearson
|TKO (punches)
|UFC Fight Night: Rockhold vs. Bisping
|
|align=center|2
|align=center|1:39
|Sydney, Australia
|
|-
|Win
|align=center|9–3–1
|Rodrigo Damm
|TKO (punches and elbows)
|UFC Fight Night: Jacaré vs. Mousasi
|
|align=center| 3
|align=center| 2:26
|Mashantucket, Connecticut, United States
|
|-
|Loss
|align=center|8–3–1
|Mitch Clarke
|Technical Submission (D'Arce choke)
|UFC 173
|
|align=center| 2
|align=center| 0:57
|Las Vegas, Nevada, United States
|
|-
|Win
|align=center|8–2–1
|Kevin Lee
|Decision (unanimous)
|UFC 169
|
|align=center|3
|align=center|5:00
|Newark, New Jersey, United States
|
|-
|Win
|align=center|7–2–1
|Piotr Hallmann
|Decision (unanimous)
|UFC Fight Night: Machida vs. Munoz
|
|align=center|3
|align=center|5:00
|Manchester, England
|
|-
|Win
|align=center|6–2–1
| Ryan Couture
|Decision (unanimous)
|UFC 164
|
|align=center|3
|align=center|5:00
|Milwaukee, Wisconsin, United States
|
|-
|Loss
|align=center|5–2–1
| Michael Chiesa
|Technical Submission (rear-naked choke)
|The Ultimate Fighter: Live Finale
|
|align=center|1
|align=center|2:47
|Las Vegas, Nevada, United States
|
|-
|Loss
|align=center|5–1–1
| Pat Audinwood
|Submission (armbar)
|Ring of Combat 38
|
|align=center|1
|align=center|2:06
|Atlantic City, New Jersey, United States
|
|-
|Win
|align=center|5–0–1
| Gabriel Miglioli
|TKO (punches)
|Ring of Combat 37
|
|align=center|1
|align=center|0:26
|Atlantic City, New Jersey, United States
|
|-
|Win
|align=center|4–0–1
| Gabriel Miglioli
|Decision (split)
|Ring of Combat 36
|
|align=center|3
|align=center|4:00
|Atlantic City, New Jersey, United States
|
|-
|Win
|align=center|3–0–1
| Joshua Key
|TKO (punches)
|Ring of Combat 27
|
|align=center|1
|align=center|1:47
|Atlantic City, New Jersey, United States
|
|-
|Win
|align=center|2–0–1
| Tim Sylvester
|KO (punch)
|Ring of Combat 25
|
|align=center|1
|align=center|0:15
|Atlantic City, New Jersey, United States
|
|-
|Draw
|align=center|
| Will Martinez
|Draw (unanimous)
|Ring of Combat 24
|
|align=center|3
|align=center|4:00
|Atlantic City, New Jersey, United States
|
|-
|Win
|align=center|1–0
| Mervin Rodriguez
|Submission (anaconda choke)
|Ring of Combat 23
|
|align=center|1
|align=center|1:15
|Atlantic City, New Jersey, United States
|

|-
|Win
|align=center|4–0
| Vinc Pichel
| Decision (unanimous)
| rowspan=4|The Ultimate Fighter: Live
| (Live airdate)
|align=center|2
|align=center|5:00
| rowspan=4|Las Vegas, Nevada, United States
|
|-
|Win
|align=center|3–0
| Andy Ogle
| TKO (elbow and punches)
| (Live airdate)
|align=center|1
|align=center|4:44
|
|-
|Win
|align=center|2–0
| Myles Jury
| Decision (split)
| (Live airdate)
|align=center|3
|align=center|5:00
|
|-
|Win
|align=center|1–0
| Jon Tuck
| Decision (unanimous)
| (Live airdate)
|align=center|1
|align=center|5:00
|

See also

 List of male mixed martial artists

References

External links
 
 

1987 births
Living people
American male mixed martial artists
American people of Italian descent
People of Calabrian descent
Mixed martial artists from New York (state)
People from Wantagh, New York
American practitioners of Brazilian jiu-jitsu
Nassau Community College alumni
American real estate brokers
Ultimate Fighting Championship male fighters
Lightweight mixed martial artists
Mixed martial artists utilizing collegiate wrestling
Mixed martial artists utilizing Brazilian jiu-jitsu